

Kingdom of Hawaii
The orders and decorations formerly awarded in by the Kingdom of Hawaiʻi are:

Royal Orders
  Royal Order of Kamehameha I
  Royal Order of Kalākaua I
  Royal Order of Kapiʻolani
  Royal Order of the Crown of Hawaiʻi
  Royal Order of the Star of Oceania
  Royal Household Order for Ladies

Royal Medals
  King David Kalākaua Election Medal
  Professional Career's Cross
  Royal Hawaiian Agricultural Society Medal
  Coronation Medal of Kalākaua I
  The Round the World Medal

Royal Anniversary Medals
  Kalākaua and Kapiʻolani Medal
  King Kalākaua I Jubilee Medal

 George Charles Moʻoheau Beckley
 Emmanuel Bushayija
 Archibald Scott Cleghorn
 John Owen Dominis
 Duarte Pio, Duke of Braganza
 John Ena Jr.
 Curtis P. Iaukea
 Charles Hastings Judd
 Junius Kaʻae
 John Mākini Kapena
 Kapiʻolani
 Victoria Kinoiki Kekaulike
 Likelike
 Liliʻuokalani
 Poʻomaikelani

Republic of Hawaii
The Orders and decorations formerly awarded by the Republic of Hawaiʻi are:
  National Guard of Hawaiʻi Medal

State of Hawaii

Hawaii National Guard State Awards
  Hawaii Medal of Honor
  Hawaii Medal for Valor
  Hawaii Distinguished Service Order
  Hawaii Medal for Merit
  Hawaii Commendation Medal
  Hawaii Service Medal (type 2)
  Hawaii State Active Duty Ribbon
  Hawaii 1968 Federal Service Ribbon
  Hawaii Active Duty Basic Training Ribbon
  Hawaii Hurricane Iniki Ribbon
  Hawaii Operation Kokua Ribbon
  Hawaii Recruiting Ribbon

Others
  Living Treasures of Hawaiʻi have been awarded since 1976 by the Buddhist temple Honpa Hongwanji Mission of Hawaii

References
 

 
History of Hawaii
Hawaii culture